Montebello Township is one of twenty-four townships in Hancock County, Illinois, USA.  As of the 2010 census, its population was 3,579 and it contained 1,575 housing units.

Geography

Cities, towns, villages
 Elvaston (partial)
 Hamilton

Cemeteries
The township contains these two cemeteries: Greenwood and Oakwood.

Major highways
  U.S. Route 136
  Illinois Route 96

Landmarks
 Wildcat Spring Park
Vanished Town of Montebello Marker  https://commons.wikimedia.org/wiki/File:Vanished_Montebello.jpg

Demographics

School districts
 Hamilton Community Consolidated School District 328

Political districts
 Illinois's 18th congressional district
 State House District 94
 State Senate District 47

References
 United States Census Bureau 2008 TIGER/Line Shapefiles
 
 United States National Atlas

External links
 City-Data.com
 Illinois State Archives
 Township Officials of Illinois

Townships in Hancock County, Illinois
Townships in Illinois